Clockenflap Music and Arts Festival, commonly abbreviated to "Clockenflap", is an annual music and arts festival held in Hong Kong. It incorporates international, regional and local live music, film, art installations, street, and kids' area. 60,000 people attended the 2015 event and was widely considered HK's marquee music event of the year.

History 
Clockenflap was founded in 2008 and is organized by Jay Forster, Mike Hill and Justin Sweeting. Their stated goals for the festival are to nurture the Hong Kong arts, music and film scene and "put the city on Asia's contemporary media-arts circuit". The NME credits Clockenflap for the "pioneering role it has played in nurturing the Hongkong indie and alternative music scenes, as well as bringing International talent to Hongkong audiences".

The first Clockenflap festival was held in a concrete public space in an empty housing development called "Cyberport", in front of 1500 attendees. It later expanded to the West Kowloon Cultural District.

Festivals

Clockenflap 2023 
Clockenflap 2023 was held from 3 to 5 March 2023 in Central Harbourfront Event Space.  The next edition will be held from 1 to 3 December 2023.

Clockenflap 2021 
Clockenflap 2021 was cancelled due to restrictions on international travel, tightened rules and regulations on outdoor events, and a requirement for a seated audience with no food or drink consumption on site.

Clockenflap 2020 
Clockenflap 2020 had to be postponed due to the coronavirus pandemic.

Clockenflap 2019 
Clockenflap 2019 was scheduled to be held from 22 to 24 November 2019 in Central Harbourfront Event Space. The organisers cancelled the event due to the 2019–20 Hong Kong protests.

Clockenflap 2018 
Clockenflap 2018 was held from 9 to 11 November 2018 in Central Harbourfront Event Space.

Clockenflap 2017 
Clockenflap 2017 was held from 17 to 19 November 2017.

Clockenflap 2016 

Clockenflap 2016 was held from 25 to 27 November 2016 in Central Harbourfront Event Space.

Clockenflap 2015 

Clockenflap 2015 was held from 27 to 29 November 2015 in West Kowloon Cultural District.

Clockenflap 2014 
Clockenflap 2014 was held from 28 to 30 November 2014 in West Kowloon Cultural District.

Clockenflap 2013 
2013's festival extended to a 3-day event and grew to over 30,000 people attending with 7 music stages with new additions of a Cabaret Tent and an Arts Village. The festival was held from 29 November to 1 December.

Clockenflap 2012 
Held once more on the West Kowloon Waterfront Promenade, the festival site expanded to allow for six performance stages, a dedicated children's entertainment area. Over 25,000 people attended the festival over the weekend of 1 to 2 December.

Clockenflap 2011 
Clockenflap 2011 took place from 10 to 11 December 2011 and was the first to be held at the festival's iconic new location, the West Kowloon Waterfront Promenade. Unlike previous (and preceding) years, it was completely free to the public when late stage venue restrictions prevented the sale of tickets.

Clockenflap 2010 
Due to various restrictions, the third Clockenflap was a one-night festival held in a warehouse on Saturday, 20 November 2010.

Clockenflap 2009 
The second Clockenflap festival was a two-day festival held on Saturday-Sunday, 7–8 November 2009 at Cyberport.

Clockenflap 2008 
The first Clockenflap festival was held on Saturday 12 January 2008 at Cyberport. Some 1,500 people attended.

References

External links 
 

Music festivals in Hong Kong
Electronic music festivals in China
Music festivals established in 2008
2008 establishments in Hong Kong